Cyperus holstii is a species of sedge that is native to central Africa, including the Democratic Republic of the Congo, Tanzania, and Kenya.

The species was first formally described by the botanist Georg Kükenthal in 1925.

See also
List of Cyperus species

References

holstii
Taxa named by Georg Kükenthal
Plants described in 1925
Flora of the Democratic Republic of the Congo
Flora of Kenya
Flora of Tanzania